Papaipema cataphracta, the burdock borer,  is a moth of the family Noctuidae. It is found from Quebec and Maine to Florida, west to Louisiana, north to Saskatchewan.

The wingspan is 29–45 mm. The moth flies from August to October depending on the location.

The larvae feed on various plants, including Arctium, Lilium, and Thistles. They bore into the roots and stems of their host plants.

External links
butterfliesandmoths.org
Papaipema cataphracta, BugGuide

Papaipema
Moths of North America
Moths described in 1864